The 1976 Major League Baseball All-Star Game was the 47th midseason exhibition between the all-stars of the American League (AL) and the National League (NL), the two leagues comprising Major League Baseball. The game was played on July 13, 1976, at Veterans Stadium in Philadelphia, Pennsylvania, home of the Philadelphia Phillies of the National League. The game resulted in a 7–1 victory for the NL.

This was the third time that the All-Star Game had been played in Philadelphia, though the first to be played in Veteran's Stadium.  Both the 1943 and 1952 games were played in Philadelphia's Shibe Park with the then Philadelphia Athletics hosting in 1943 and the Phillies hosting in 1952.  The All-Star Game would return to Veterans Stadium in 1996.

The honorary captains were Robin Roberts (for the NL) and Bob Lemon (for the AL).

Starting with this All-Star Game, both "O Canada" and "The Star-Spangled Banner" would be sung as part of the annual pregame ceremonies.

American League roster
The American League roster included 7 future Hall of Fame players, denoted in italics.

Elected starters

Pitchers

Reserve position players

Coaching staff

National League roster
The National League roster included 5 future Hall of Fame players, denoted in italics.

Elected starters

Pitchers

Reserve position players

Coaching staff

Starting lineups
While the starters were elected by the fans, the batting orders and starting pitchers were selected by the managers.

Umpires

Scoring summary
Following the pattern of many of the previous All-Star Games, the NL scored first and early, putting up two runs in the bottom of the first inning.  Pete Rose led off with a single, and scored when the next batter, Steve Garvey, tripled.  After Joe Morgan flew out, George Foster grounded out, allowing Garvey to score from third base.

The National League added two more runs in the bottom of the third inning, with Catfish Hunter pitching in relief.  With one out, Joe Morgan singled.  George Foster then hit a home run, scoring Morgan to bring the NL lead to 4–0.

The lone AL run came in the top of the third inning, with Tom Seaver pitching for the NL in relief of Randy Jones.  With two outs, Fred Lynn hit a home run to reduce the NL lead to 4–1.

The game's scoring was closed out in the bottom of the eighth, as the NL scored three runs off of AL relief pitcher Frank Tanana.  Dave Cash led off with a single, and went to second base when Tony Pérez walked.  Bill Russell grounded into a 5–4–3 double play, with Pérez out at second base, Russell out at first base, but Cash advancing to third base.  Ken Griffey singled, scoring Cash.  César Cedeño then hit a home run, scoring Griffey, and giving the NL a 7–1 lead that would hold up as the final score.

Line score

Game notes and records

Randy Jones was credited with the win.  Mark Fidrych was credited with the loss.

Mark Fidrych was only the second rookie to ever start as a pitcher in an All-Star Game (Dave Stenhouse had started the second All-Star Game of 1962).

The five Cincinnati Reds selected by the fans to start the game, and the two reserves selected by manager Sparky Anderson combined for seven hits, four runs scored, and four runs batted in.

As part of the United States Bicentennial observances, the city of Philadelphia – site of the Continental Congress and the signing of the Declaration of Independence – was selected to host the 1976 NBA All-Star Game, the 1976 National Hockey League All-Star Game, and the 1976 NCAA Final Four in addition to the 1976 Major League Baseball All-Star Game.

References

External links
 1976 All-Star Game summary @baseball-reference.com
 1976 All-Star Game summary @baseball almanac.com
 1976 All-Star Game box score @baseball almanac.com
 1976 All-Star Game play by play @baseball almanac.com

All-Star Game
1976
1976 Major
Philadel Pennsylvania
1976
July 1976 sports events in the United States